Sgùrr na Coinnich is the highest peak on the Sleat peninsula at the east end of the Isle of Skye. Together with its slightly lower neighbour, Beinn na Caillich, it overlooks the Skye Bridge that links the towns of Kyle of Lochalsh and Kyleakin.

The maps suggest that the best starting point is the  Bealach Uday, which marks the highest point of the minor road from Broadford to Kylerhea and is less than 2 km from the summit. But the terrain immediately to the north of this point is very rough and covered by thick heather.

A series of small but steep local ridges, separated by bogs and oriented perpendicular to the direction of the summit add further to the discomfort of the climber. An alternative and probably easier, albeit longer, route starts at Kylerhea and can include the summit of Beinn na Caillich. Higher up, the terrain becomes smoother and the vegetation shorter.

References 
 Isle of Skye Walks

Mountains and hills of the Isle of Skye
Marilyns of Scotland
Grahams